Alicia Bellán (10 October 1931 – 10 July 2018) was an Argentine film actress who also worked as a theatre professional and as a television actress during her early career. She graduated at the Universidad Nacional de las Artes during the 1950s and made her film acting debut at the age of 23 through the 1954 film Los Ojos llenos de amor. Alicia also went onto work in notable theatre companies for many decades after the era of late 1970s. She died on 10 July 2018 at the age of 86 in Buenos Aires after a long illness.

Career
After graduating from the National University of Arts, she worked in the Argentine film industry in the early 1950s. Her debut film was Los Ojos llenos de amor which was released in 1954. Her last feature film was Procesado 1040 which was released in 1958. She found work as a stage actress.

In the 1970s, Bellán received the opportunity to work at the Teatro General San Martín which is considered as one of the best theatre companies in Buenos Aires. During the same period, she was able to work with Teatro Coliseo, Teatro Nacional Cervantes and Opera Theatre. Alicia Bellán also acted in a 1964 comedy telenovela El amor tiene cara de mujer (Love has a Woman's Face), her most notable appearance on television.

Death
Alicia Bellán died on 10 July 2018 in her hometown at the age of 86 after a long illness. Her remains were buried the National Cemetery.

Filmography

Films

Television 

 El amor tiene cara de mujer (1964)

References

External links 

 

1931 births
2018 deaths
Argentine film actresses
Argentine television actresses
Argentine stage actresses
20th-century Argentine actresses
Actresses from Buenos Aires